Ilsa may refer to:

People
 Ilsa J. Bick, American science fiction writer
 Ilsa Konrads (born 1944), Australian freestyle swimmer

Fictional characters
 Ilsa Lund, in the 1942 film Casablanca
 Ilsa, protagonist of a sexploitation film series starting with Ilsa, She Wolf of the SS (1975)
 Ilsa Brandes, title character of Ilsa (novel), a 1946 novel by Madeleine L'Engle
 Ilsa Pucci, from the TV series Human Target
 Ilsa Shickelgrubermeiger, from the TV series The Suite Life of Zack and Cody
 Ilsa Faust, in the films Mission: Impossible – Rogue Nation (2015), and its sequel Mission: Impossible – Fallout (2018)

ILSA
 International Law Students Association, a non-profit association of students and lawyers dedicated to the promotion of international law
 Interstate Land Sales Full Disclosure Act of 1968, US Congressional act passed to facilitate regulation of interstate land sales
 Iran and Libya Sanctions Act, a 1996 act of the US Congress that imposed economic sanctions on firms doing business with Iran and Libya
 Intermodalidad de Levante S.A.,  aka Iryo, a Spanish operator of high-speed trains

Other uses
 Tropical Storm Ilsa (disambiguation), various cyclones
 Ilsa (novel), a 1946 novel by Madeleine L'Engle

See also
 Ilse (disambiguation)